The , abbreviated as PTCG or Pokémon TCG, is a collectible card game developed by Creatures Inc. based on the Pokémon franchise. It was first published in October 1996 by Media Factory in Japan. In the US, it was first published by Wizards of the Coast. In June 2003, Nintendo transferred the publishing rights from Wizards of the Coast to The Pokémon Company. As of March 2022, the game has sold over 43.2 billion cards worldwide.

Gameplay

The Pokémon Trading Card Game is a strategy-based card game that is usually played on a designated play-mat where two players (assuming the role of Pokémon trainer) use their Pokémon to battle each other. Each player puts one Pokémon into play as their Active Pokémon and attacks their opponent's Active Pokémon. A Pokémon that has sustained enough damage from attacks–that reaches or exceeds its HP–is referred to as being "Knocked Out". For each of the opponent's "Knocked Out" Pokémon the victor scores 1 Prize card, although some special card mechanics grant up to 2 or 3 Prize cards in accordance with their higher hierarchy. Prize cards are primary win conditions, with the possession of six Prize cards being an instantaneous win. Other ways to win are by "Knocking Out" all the Pokémon the opponent has on their Bench (i.e. the row behind the Active Spot, fighting Pokémon that houses five additional Pokémon to supplant the Active Pokémon if it retreats or is "Knocked Out") so the opponent has no Pokémon left, or if at the opponent's turn there are no cards left to draw into their deck.

Players begin by having one player select heads or tails, and the other flips a coin; the winner of the coin flip will decide who goes first or second. (Dice may be used in place of coins, with even numbers representing heads and odd numbers representing tails; dice are also primarily used in official tournaments organized by The Pokémon Company). The player going first cannot attack or play a Supporter card on their first turn, unless they have a card that specifies otherwise. Players shuffle their decks and draw seven cards, and then each puts one Basic Pokémon in play as their Active Pokémon. This Pokémon is the one that is actively attacking and receiving damage. If a player does not have any Basic Pokémon, they must call mulligan, shuffle, and then draw another hand until they draw a Basic Pokémon; the opponent may draw one additional card per mulligan. Once both players have at least one Basic Pokémon, they can play up to five more Basic Pokémon onto their Bench, and then take the top six cards of their deck and place them to the side as Prize cards.

Play alternates between players who may take several actions during their turn, including playing additional Basic Pokémon, evolving their Pokémon, playing Item cards, playing 1 Stadium card, playing 1 Supporter card, attaching a Pokémon Tool card to one of your Pokémon, attaching 1 Energy card, and using Pokémon Abilities and attacking. A player may also retreat their Active Pokémon, switching the Active Pokémon with one on the Bench by paying the Active Pokémon's retreat cost of a certain number of Energy. At the end of their turn, a player may use one of their Active Pokémon's attacks, provided the prerequisite number and types of Energy are attached to that Pokémon. Effects from that attack are then activated and damage may be placed on the Defending Pokémon; some attacks simply have effects but do not do damage, as they may be modified depending on whether the defender has a weakness or a resistance to the attacker's Pokémon type. Player ends their turn after they attach an Energy card to their Pokémon to attack the opposing, defending Pokémon. If they "Knock Out" the opposing Pokémon, they may take 1 prize card before ending their turn.

Card types 
All Pokémon cards depict one or multiple Pokémon from the Pokémon video games series, and they specify a name, an elemental type, one or more attacks and/or an Ability, and a certain amount of HP. Basic Pokémon are Pokémon that have not evolved and thus can be played directly onto the Bench. Each player may have up to six Pokémon in play at a time: one in the Active Spot and up to five on the Bench.

Most Pokémon include attacks that require a certain amounts of Energy to use. Attacks deal damage to the opponent's Active Pokémon and sometimes deal additional damage to their Benched Pokémon; additionally, an attack may also perform other functions, such as drawing cards, inflicting Special Conditions, or altering the opponent's board state. The vast majority of these attacks require Energy. Abilities, also called Poké-Powers and Poké-Bodies until 2011, are not attacks but special effects that the player can use once  or multiple during their turn; such as drawing additional cards or switching opponent's Active Pokémon with one of their Benched Pokémon; they remain in effect as long as the Pokémon with the Ability remains in play.

The other type of Pokémon card are Evolution Pokémon. In contrast to a Basic Pokémon, Evolution Pokémon cannot be directly put into play; they must be placed on top of the corresponding previous Stage Pokémon to evolve it. Stage 1 Pokémon evolve from Basic Pokémon, and Stage 2 Pokémon evolve from Stage 1 Pokémon. As a Pokémon evolves, it gains HP and their attacks change, usually becoming more powerful. Pokémon ex cards were first introduced in Pokémon TCG: EX Ruby and Sapphire. These cards usually have higher attacks and HP than lower-hierarchy Pokémon, and they grant an extra (2 in-total) prize card to the opponent when "Knocked Out."

Baby Pokémon, introduced in Pokémon TCG: Neo Genesis, are a special set of Basic Pokémon with lower HP and occasionally powerful attacks to make up for this lack of other stats. Mega Evolution Pokémon, introduced in Pokémon TCG: XY, are evolved from Pokémon EX. BREAK Pokémon were also introduced in the BreakThrough Expansion later in the XY Series. Variations of Basic, Evolution, and Baby Pokémon cards have appeared in many sets, usually indicated with a word before or after the Pokémon's name. Secret Rare, as its name implies, are Pokémon of the some of the rarest collectibles. They are usually indicated by shiny holofoil and gold outline textures. Secret Rare Pokémon comprise Shiny Pokémon, Trainers, Alternate Art Pokémon, and some even rarer Mega Evolution Pokémon cards. 

Pokémon GX cards were debuted in Pokémon TCG: Sun and Moon. These cards have a special attack at the bottom of the card that can only be used once per game. Also Introduced in the Sun and Moon expansion series are Alolan forms, which are reprints of existing Pokémon in alternative form with different designs and types.

Pokémon V and Pokémon VMAX were introduced in Pokémon TCG: Sword and Shield; they grant 2 and 3 Prize cards when "Knocked Out," respectively. Pokémon V are Basic Pokémon that evolve into Pokémon VMAX. Later mechanics also introduced in the Sword and Shield series are V-Union, which are 1 "unified" card with multiple attacks/Abilities form from 4 separate cards that grants 3 Prize cards when "Knocked Out"; and 2-Prize-card-cost VSTAR mechanic that features special VSTAR Powers that can be used only once per game. VSTAR offers an alternative evolution of Pokémon V besides Pokémon VMAX but does not necessarily intends to supersede the latter. Radiant Pokémon were introduced in the English set Pokémon TCG: Astral Radiance, and are restricted to only being able to have one Radiant Pokémon in your deck.

Energy cards are attached to Pokémon in play to power their attacks. Only one Energy card may be attached per turn, unless a player possesses a card that specifies otherwise. There are two categories of Energy cards: basic Energy and Special Energy. The nine different basic Energy types which correspond to Pokémon card types are Grass, Fire, Water, Lightning, Psychic, Fighting, Darkness, Metal, and Fairy. The Dragon type do not have their corresponding basic Energy card and instead use multiple types of Energy cards. Basic Energy cards fulfill costs for attacking and retreating and don't have additional effects, while Special Energy cards have additional usages. Most attacks require a certain type and amount of Energy. If the attack has a Colorless Energy requirement, then that requirement can be met by any Energy card.

Trainer cards perform various functions to affect the game, for example healing Pokémon, discarding Energy from opposing Pokémon, or retrieving cards from the discard pile. Before the Diamond & Pearl expansion, all cards that were not Pokémon or Energy were considered Trainer cards. Trainers have since been subdivided into categories. Item cards directly affect the battling Pokémon, Pokémon Tool cards are attached to a Pokémon and modify their features, Stadium cards stay in play when you play it. Supporter cards have strong effects, but only one can be played per turn.

Pokémon types

Pokémon Types are elemental attributes determining the strengths and weaknesses for each Pokémon and its attacks. Pokémon take double damage from attacks of types they are weak to and less damage from attacks they resist. These type matchups offset one another in rock–paper–scissors-style relationships. Pokémon Types in the TCG include Fire, Fighting, Dragon, Lightning, Grass, Water, Fairy, Psychic, Darkness, Metal, and Colorless. Other Pokémon types such as Ice and Ground types from the rest of the Pokémon franchise, however, does not have their own types in the TCG and instead are categorized/incorporated inside other types; for example, Ice type and Ground type are categorized under Water type and Fighting type, respectively.

Beginning Pokémon TCG: Sword & Shield, Poison type Pokémon are categorized under Darkness-type; Poison-type were previously Psychic type, and before that they were categorized under Grass type. Beginning Pokémon TCG: EX Dragon, Dragon type Pokémon are now listed as Dragon-type, and they were previously listed as Colorless type.

A simplified type system was adopted from the video games for use in the trading card game. Darkness and Metal types was introduced alongside the corresponding Pokémon Gold and Silver video game, the Dragon-type was introduced in the Japanese Dragon Selection set; and Fairy type was introduced in the XY set to correspond to its introduction in the video games, but they were later removed in Pokémon TCG: Sword and Pokémon Shield. While most Pokémon have only one type, three exceptions are Pokémon TCG: EX Team Magma vs Team Aqua which introduced dual-type Pokémon that have two different types, Pokémon TCG: XY Steam Siege, and Pokémon TCG: HeartGold and SoulSilver era sets. Dual types were also utilized in Pokémon Legend cards to emphasize the multiple Pokémon the mechanic has in the HeartGold and SoulSilver. In August 2016, XY Steam Siege reintroduced the dual-type mechanic, but this time it is on regular and EX Pokémon.

Sets

The Pokémon TCG debuted In Japan in 1996 with the release of "1st Starter & Expansion Pack/Base Set" (第1弾スターターパック & 第1弾拡張パック), which was the original core series of cards and Theme Decks released in Japan on October 20, 1996, and in the United States on January 9, 1999. The "1st Starter & Expansion Pack" contained a mixed variety of Pokémon cards depicting the original 150 Pokémon species in the main Pokémon franchise, and it is the only expansion to not have a set logo or symbol (i.e. except for the error "no-symbol" Pokemon TCG: Jungle cards).

In the United States, the "1998 Pokémon Demo Game Plastic Pack" was the earliest introduction to the Pokémon TCG, preceding the "1st Starter & Expansion Pack"; and consisting of 24 Base Set shadowless cards and an instruction manual. "The Pokémon Demo Game Plastic Pack", "Base Set", along with the subsequent expansions "Jungle," "Fossil," "Base Set 2," "Team Rocket," "Gym Heroes," "Gym Challenge," make up the "First Generation Sets" published by the original English-edition publisher Wizards of the Coasts. Similarly, the "Second Generation Sets" published by Wizards comprised "Neo Genesis," "Neo Discovery," "Southern Islands," "Neo Revelation," "Neo Destiny," "Legendary Collection," "Expedition Base Set," "Aquapolis", and "Skyridge." The "Second Generation Sets" is the last collection set published by Wizards before Nintendo transferred the publishing right to The Pokémon Company In July 2003. Since July 2003, The Pokémon Company has published eight additional "Generation" sets, which has gradually transitioned the TCG to more modern gameplay and mechanics.

The release of Pokemon TCG: Scarlet & Violet in North America and its Japanese counterpart the dual Pokemon TCG: Scarlet ex and Pokemon TCG: Violet ex marks the 95th expansion set released in English and the 88th released in Japanese.

Card collecting 

Pokémon cards are sold at stores in many different formats including pre-constructed decks, booster-packs-bundled promo cards set, booster box of 36 packs, or individual packs. Subsequently, cards are also available through e-commerce websites and individual sellers. However, buyers should be cautioned of fake Pokémon cards.

Pokémon card collectables are worth different values in accordance with their levels of rarity. This is not always the case, however. Sometimes lower rarity cards can be worth more than higher rarity ones. This depends on the frequency of use within competitive play, the age of the card, number of cards printed, and a variety of other factors. From the lowest to the highest level, cards rarities are indicated by different shapes on the bottom corner, i.e. Common (circle), Uncommon (diamond), and Rare (star). Japanese-edition cards use letters rather than shapes to denote rarities; i.e. from the lowest to the highest level, C, U, R, RR, SR, and UR. In a single Pokémon TCG booster pack, a consumer can usually expect to pull 10 cards in total, i.e. five Common cards, three Uncommon cards, a reverse holographic card of any rarity, and sometimes a Rare card. Starting with the Scarlet and Violet series however, each pack will contain 3 Rare cards, all of which are holographic. In contrast to the basic Common and Uncommon, Rare collectables are branched into many different variants, comprising Holo Rare, Reverse Holo, Half Art/Half Body, Full Art/Full Body, Secret Rare, Ultra Rare, Rainbow Rare, Promo, and card mechanics including EX/GX, V/VSTAR/VMAX, and Tag Team. Rarities also account for old card collectibles such as "1st-edition Base Set" and "First Generation Sets," and such collectibles are some of the rarest and most expensive Pokémon cards with some valuing at thousands and millions of dollars.

Holo Rare are Rare cards that have a holographic illustration, whereas Reverse Holo are any-rarity cards that have holographic textures elsewhere on the surface except for the main illustration. Half Art and Full Art, as the name imply, are Half Body and Full Body that depicts artworks covering the entire/half the card surface, respectively. In comparison, Secret Rares are reprints of Full Art or Half Arts but with additional artwork schemes such as alternative holofoil scheme, shiny scheme, or a gold trim; they are characterized by a set number past the actual printed size of the set (ex. 242/220). Secret Rares also comprise the subset Rainbow Rare, which features similar materials but in rainbow-color foil schemes. In response to these collectible's considerable rarities, card collectors have use protective card sleeves to preserve them from wear and tear.

From least to most, the top 15 most rare and expensive Pokémon cards are "20th Anniversary 24-karat real-gold Pikachu", "Prerelease Raichu", "Master's Key, "Espeon and Umbreon Gold Star POP Series 5", "2002 Pokémon World Championships No. 1 Trainer", "1996 Pokémon Japanese Base Set No Rarity Symbol Holo Venusaur", "1999 Pokémon Japanese Promo Tropical Mega Battle Tropical Wind", "1999 Super Secret Battle No. 1 Trainer, "2006 Pokémon World Championships Promo No. 2 Trainer", "2000 Pokémon Neo Genesis 1st Edition Holo Lugia #9", "Kangaskhan-Holo #115 Family Event Trophy Card", "Black Star Ishihara Signed GX Promo Card", "Pokémon Blastoise #009/165R Commissioned Presentation Galaxy Star Hologram", "1999 First Edition Shadowless Holographic Charizard #4", and a PSA-graded 10 "Pikachu Illustrator".

The "Pikachu Illustrator" is the rarest and most expensive Pokémon card ever sold in history, and it was acquired by the celebrity and collector Logan Paul for $5,275,000 in July 2021. Created as a prize for the 1997-1998 Pokémon design contests organized by the Japanese manga-magazine CoroCoro Comic and with only 41 copies printed, it is the only Pokémon card to say “Illustrator” instead of "Trainer" like other Trainer cards. The card was illustrated by Atsuko Nishida, the original designer of the Pokémon species including Pikachu. The Japanese imprint reads: “We certify that your illustration is an excellent entry in the Pokémon Card Game Illust Contest. Therefore, we state that you are an Officially Authorized Pokémon Card Illustrator and admire your skill."

Competitive play

In addition to the collectible aspect of the card game, The Pokémon Company International (formerly known as Pokémon USA) has also organized Play! Pokémon, formerly known as Pokémon Organized Play (POP), players can battle others in tournaments and earn player points, two-card booster packets for promotional sets, badges, stickers and other prizes. POP are governed by League Leaders and League Owners The Play also features a professor program, where individuals aged 18 or over may be nominated as a "professor," who can help sanction the tournament.

League Leaders assist in organizing the league, while League Owners are the main organizer of the event. The latter report directly to the Organized Play program every seven weeks.  A league cycle is usually divided into eight seasons, each of which lasts about five weeks and is typically represented by themes found in Pokémon (e.g. gym badges, starter Pokémon). Play! Pokémon supports both standard and expanded card format, however in its competitive tournaments only standard format (i.e. card rotation format that discontinues older Pokémon cards to foster new strategies and a healthy competitive environment) are permitted. In contrast to the former, expanded card format permits inclusion of any Pokémon cards, regardless if they are older cards.

Prerelease tournaments are organized just before each expansion each set is released, usually on the two weekends before a set is released. At Prerelease Tournaments players are given three booster packs from the judge to construct a 40-card deck, with only 4 prize cards, using only the cards pulled from the packs and basic energy cards provided by the judges.

Players in a tournament are split into three age categories: Junior (11 years old and younger), Senior (12 to 15 years old), and Master (16 years old and older). Notable references include Austin Brewen who won the first junior tournament, Brenden Zhang who won the first Senior Tournament, and Arturo Heras who won the first Master Tournament. These tournaments play several rounds, where players will play a standard game against each other and wins and losses will be recorded. In most tournaments, there are some Swiss-style rounds where players are paired up against others of similar win/loss ratios, usually from their age group (this does not always occur in smaller events, though). Afterward, there will be a cut off the top record-holders (approximately the top 1/8 of participants) where players will play best two out of three matches and the loser gets eliminated (standard tournament bracket style), with an eventual winner.

POP runs a season for these tournaments, which allows players to earn larger prizes and play in a more competitive environment in comparison to League. These range from City and Regional Championships, all the way up to the Pokémon World Championships, the single invite-only event of the year. Players can earn invites to the World Championships by winning or ranking high at International Championships, doing well at tournaments to get Championship Points, or by qualifying in the Last Chance Qualifier. The World Championships is a three-day tournament, with one eventual winner in each age group; the winner of the Masters Division age group is generally noticed as the best player in the world for that season. Some of these methods are only used in the United States, as PUI and POP are based in the United States, but they are represented by local distributors who provide the Organized Play program to their own country.

Although The Pokémon Company International tries to keep Organized Play as uniform as possible globally, there are some notable differences in how POP is run outside of the United States. The Pokémon Card Laboratory (PCL), located in Japan, is the designer of new cards and the ultimate authority on any matter relating to the Pokémon Trading Card Game. It can declare rulings on any in-game circumstance, issue errata, change card text after publishing, and change the basic game rules, although the latter three rarely occur. PCL runs Organized Play in Japan. The Pokémon Trading Card Game in most European countries is currently handled by The Pokémon Company International. Certain countries have no direct official presence; in these regions, distributors of the game run tournaments. European countries can qualify for positions at the Pokémon Trading Card Game World Championships each year, through National Championships and European Rankings.

2013 Worlds - Vancouver, British Columbia, Canada

2014 Worlds - Washington, D.C., U.S.

2015 Worlds - Boston, Massachusetts, U.S.

2016 Worlds - San Francisco, California, U.S.

2017 Worlds - Anaheim, California, U.S.

2018 Worlds - Nashville, Tennessee, U.S.

2019 Worlds - Washington, D.C., U.S.

2020 - 2021 All events have been canceled due to the COVID-19 pandemic

2022 - London, England, U.K.

2023 - Yokohama, Japan

Super Trainer Showdowns
On August 26–27, 2000, forty-two Pokémon players from around the world met at the Hilton Hawaiian Village in Honolulu for the Tropical Mega Battle, an international communication event for the Pokémon Trading Card Game. The Tropical Mega Battle brought together children aged 14 and under from the United States, Japan, France, Italy, Canada, Spain, Germany, the Netherlands, and the United Kingdom for two days in Honolulu, Hawaii. Children participating in the Tropical Mega Battle received invitations through Qualifier tournaments, DCI rankings, and other events in their respective countries.

The Super Trainer Showdowns are large-scale Pokémon TCG tournaments held in the United States by the TCG's original publisher Wizards of the Coast between 2000 and 2001. The tournaments are divided into three age groups: 10 and under, 11 to 14 years old, and 15 years and older. The Super Trainer Showdowns are preceded by a series of Qualifier Tournaments held across the United States where players can compete for qualification of the Super Trainer Showdowns, and where 10-under and 11–14 years players can win additional trips and tickets to the Showdowns for themselves and a parent/guardian.

As of 2022, there have been a total of four Super Trainer Showdowns events. The first Super Trainer Showdown was held at Long Beach, California inside of a cruise liner, the Queen Mary on July 22, 2000; the playing format was "Unlimited", meaning that all Pokémon cards released in the United States were legal for deck construction. The second Super Trainer Showdown was held at the Meadowlands Exposition Center in Secaucus, New Jersey on November 18, 2000, with over 700 players in all three age divisions competing for the title and comprised eight rounds of Swiss-style pairings followed by a cut to a top-eight single-elimination playoff.

The third Super Trainer Showdown was held again in the Meadowlands Exposition Center in Secaucus, New Jersey on June 23–24, 2001 with more than 1,600 players attended the event; the playing format for this event was called "Modified" and allowed players to construct 60-card decks using a maximum of four of any card other than basic energy from specific sets. The fourth and final Super Trainer Showdown was held at the San Antonio Convention Center in San Antonio, Texas on December 1–2, 2001. The format was again "Modified", however the newest set Neo Discovery was also legal for the tournament.

Reception
The reviewer from the online second volume of Pyramid in 1999 stated that "Pokémon is the second most popular CCG in Japan (behind Magic: The Gathering), and it's no fluke. The game plays like a kinder, gentler version of Magic, with easier rules and graphics geared to the younger crowd." In the United States, Wizards of the Coast reported in early 1999 that it had sold 400,000 packs of Pokémon trading cards in less than six weeks of its release.

In 2016, it was the year's top-selling toy in the strategic card game subclass. In 2017, it had an 82% share of Europe's strategic card game market. As of March 2022, the game has sold over 43.2 billion cards worldwide.

Video games
The Pokémon Trading Card Game video game adaptation was developed by Hudson Soft and Creatures and published by Nintendo for the Game Boy Color console. It was released in Japan in December 1998 and later in North American and Europe in 2000, reappearing in the Nintendo 3DS Virtual Console released in 2014. The adaptation are similar in gameplay and rules, featuring 226 cards from the TCG with infrared linking for multiplayer and trading. The video game was accompanied by Pokémon Card GB2: Great Rocket-Dan Sanjō!, a Japan-exclusive sequel released in March 2001. In addition to the Pokémon Trading Card Game video game, Wizards has developed another digitalized adaptation, Pokémon Play It!, which consisted of two versions that offer players a beginner's introduction to the different gameplay aspects of TCG as they slowly transitioned into "Advanced Challenges" in the 2nd version. The first version of Pokémon Play It! was released in 1999, followed by its sequel Pokémon Play It! Version 2 in 2000.

The Pokémon Trading Card Game Online is the most prominent and the latest video game adaptation of the Pokémon TCG. It was released on March 24, 2011, as Pokémon Trainer Challenge for Microsoft Windows, Android, macOS, iOS, and iPadOS. The game initially offered three starting decks but has significantly expanded its card collection shortly after released. Beginning April 6, 2011, players can redeem digital booster packs using a promo code card bundled inside printed booster packs; they can also redeem such packs using in-game currencies and rewards. The  how-to-guide video game adaptation was released in Japan on August 5, 2011, for Nintendo DS, alongside three bundled 30-card decks, a play mat, and damage counters tokens.

On September 20, 2021, another Pokémon Trading Card Game-based video game was announced, titled Pokémon Trading Card Game Live. A closed beta of Pokémon Trading Card Game Live was released for Canadian players on February 22, 2022. Later, a global beta of Pokémon Trading Card Game Live was released on November 15, 2022 on Android, iOS, Microsoft Windows. Upon the full release, Pokémon Trading Card Game Live will be replacing Pokémon Trading Card Game Online, and the latter will be discontinued shortly after. Pokémon TCG: Crown Zenith will be the final set supported on Pokémon Trading Card Game Online. Existing players of Pokémon Trading Card Game Online will be able to transfer their account and in-game data to Pokémon Trading Card Game Live.

Further reading
Overview in Scrye #68

See also
 Obake karuta
 Pokémon

References

External links

 

 
Card games introduced in 1996
Collectible card games
Japanese card games
Wizards of the Coast games
1990s fads and trends
2020s fads and trends